Country Energy, an Australian energy retail subsidiary of Origin Energy, provides natural gas and electricity to retail customers in New South Wales, Victoria, Queensland, South Australia and the Australian Capital Territory.. Since its establishment in 2001 and until 28 February 2011, Country Energy was owned by the Government of New South Wales.

History
On 1 July 2001 Country Energy was formed by the merger of New South Wales rural-based energy retailers, Great Southern Energy, Advance Energy and Northpower - all statutory owned by the Government of New South Wales.  In addition to electricity retailing, Country Energy operated Australia's largest electricity distribution network by area, covering 95% of the area of New South Wales as well as extending into small parts of Queensland and Victoria. It was one of developers of Directlink, a high voltage direct current electricity transmission line between New South Wales and Queensland transmission grids.

On 15 December 2010, the New South Wales Treasurer, Eric Roozendaal, announced that the retail division of Country Energy (including the Country Energy brand) was sold to Origin Energy as part of a A$3.25 billion deal.  As part of the sale of the retail business the electricity distribution division was separated from Country Energy and re-branded as Essential Energy on 1 March 2011.

Operations
Country Energy has 870,000 customers, and annual revenues of $2.3 billion.  It provides natural gas and electricity to retail customers in New South Wales, Victoria, Queensland, South Australia, and the Australian Capital Territory. The two contact centres are located in the New South Wales cities of Port Macquarie and Leeton.

References

External links

Country Energy website

Former government-owned companies of New South Wales
Electric power companies of Australia